Herb Coleman may refer to:

 Herb Coleman (center) (1923–1985), American football player
 Herb Coleman (defensive lineman) (born 1971), American football player